Hypsiforma is a genus of moths of the family Erebidae. The genus was first described by Oberthür in 1923. The species are found on Madagascar.

Species
Hypsiforma bicolor (Mabille, 1879)
Hypsiforma concolora (Swinhoe, 1903)
Hypsiforma hypsoides (Butler, 1879)
Hypsiforma lambertoni Oberthür, 1923
Hypsiforma toulgoeti Viette, 1987

References

Calpinae